The 2022–23 season is the club's 18th in the history of Adelaide United Football Club since its establishment in 2003. The club is participating in the A-League Men for the 17th time, and participated in the Australia Cup for the 8th time.

Players

Squad information

Transfers

Transfers in

Transfers out

From youth squad

Contract extensions

Coaching staff

Pre-season and friendlies

Competitions

Overall record

A-League Men

League table

Results summary

Results by round

Matches

Australia Cup

Statistics

Appearances and goals
Includes all competitions. Players with no appearances not included in the list.

Disciplinary record 
Includes all competitions. The list is sorted by squad number when total cards are equal. Players with no cards not included in the list.

Note: Hiroshi Ibusuki's suspension for his red card on 23 October 2022 against Sydney FC was rescinded.

Clean sheets
Includes all competitions. The list is sorted by squad number when total clean sheets are equal. Numbers in parentheses represent games where both goalkeepers participated and both kept a clean sheet; the number in parentheses is awarded to the goalkeeper who was substituted on, whilst a full clean sheet is awarded to the goalkeeper who was on the field at the start of play. Goalkeepers with no clean sheets not included in the list.

References

Adelaide United FC seasons
Football in Australia
2022–23 A-League Men season by team